Scorborough is a village in the East Riding of Yorkshire, England.

It forms part of the civil parish of Leconfield.

The church of St Leonard is designated a Grade I listed building and is now recorded in the National Heritage List for England, maintained by Historic England.

References

External links

Villages in the East Riding of Yorkshire